Proserpine Cemetery is a cemetery located in Proserpine a town in the Whitsunday Region of Queensland, Australia. It opened in the late 1880s and has seen the burials of many of the town's and regions pioneers. It is made up of two sections. The "Old" section which was used from the late 1880s up until the 1980s and a "New" section which is the lawn cemetery that opened in the 1980s.

History 
The Proserpine Cemetery commenced being used in the late 1880s and was placed under the control of the Proserpine Shire Council in the early 1900s.

Prior to this, there were many burials in isolated locations, and we have attempted to detail all of these. Regrettably, it will always be the case that some of these "lone graves" will never be located, but to at least acknowledge that they did exist is most important.

In the early days of burials within Proserpine Cemetery, there was practically no order used in burials apart from the segregation of the Catholics and Protestants. The weather apparently dictated the location of many burials. If the burial occurred during the "wet" season, they took place in the northern section of the cemetery, while during the dry season; they were able to be carried out in the southern area.

Originally the cemetery only contained two major sections. There was the Catholic Section (now detailed on maps known as Sections C-1 to C-8 inclusive), and the Protestant Section (now detailed on maps as Sections OP-1 to OP-11) inclusive.

For a long time, babies went wherever there was a space, and admittedly they didn't take much space, so were often squeezed in between other graves. Later certain sections were allocated for baby burials. It is quite notable that within the list of "Missing Graves" the incidence of children and babies is quite significant.

Regrettably, in the early days there was evidence of colour and racial prejudice when people of certain minority groups were buried "against the fence". The fence referred to here was that which used to be erected on the western side of the old Protestant side.

Unfortunately, this fence was removed when an extension of the cemetery area proved necessary and a road was constructed. This road services the New Protestant area (now detailed on maps as Sections NP-1 to NP-9 inclusive). It is almost certain that there are graves under this road.

In the days when suicides were looked on as shameful, there was pressure for such burials to be made "outside of the gates" and there is strong evidence to suggest that at least one such burial occurred. Certainly, in the list of "Missing Graves" there are several suicides. However, despite lengthy research, it has been impossible to determine which one of these people were buried outside the cemetery, and indeed where the actual burial took place.

War graves 
Proserpine Cemetery contains many war graves of Proserpine people who have served in all major wars.

Gallery

References

External links 
 Whitsunday Regional Council – Cemeteries

Cemeteries in Queensland
Proserpine, Queensland